is a Japanese professional golfer. She plays on the LPGA of Japan Tour where she was won three times.

Professional wins (3)

LPGA of Japan Tour wins (3)

References

External links

Japanese female golfers
LPGA of Japan Tour golfers
1996 births
Living people
21st-century Japanese women